The War of 1812 Bicentennial were a series of events to commemorate the War of 1812 in  Canada  and the United States during the war's bicentenary, 2012–2015. Included here is a list of planned commemorations and organizations.

Canada
The Canadian Government marked the bicentennial as a national event.
Canadian Heritage

Provincial commemorations

Ontario
Niagara 1812 Legacy Council
Ontario Historical Society

New Brunswick
New Brunswick Provincial Committee for Commemorations of War of 1812

United States
The U.S. government has had no formal organization or committee to coordinate commemorations of the War of 1812; the War of 1812 Bicentennial Commission Act failed to pass Congress in 2006.

U.S. military commemorations
 U.S. Navy Commemoration of the Bicentennial of the War of 1812 and the Star-Spangled Banner
 Naval History and Heritage Command
Preserve the Pensions! (A project to digitize all of the War of 1812 pension files by the end of the war's bicentennial)

Illinois
Illinois War of 1812 Bicentennial Commission
Illinois War of 1812 Society

Indiana
Vincennes War of 1812 Bicentennial Commission

Iowa
Planned commemorations at the old Fort Madison site.

Kentucky
Kentucky War of 1812 Bicentennial Commission

Louisiana
Commemoration of the 200th anniversary of the Battle of New Orleans  (January 8, 2015)

Maryland
Maryland War of 1812 Bicentennial Commission
Maryland's Star Spangled 200 Celebration

Michigan
The Michigan Commission on the Commemoration of the Bicentennial of the War of 1812

New York
In 2011, New York state Gov. Andrew Cuomo vetoed a bill to establish a formal War Of 1812 Bicentennial Commission. Previous versions of the bill were vetoed repeatedly by Gov. David Paterson in 2009 and 2010.

North Carolina
North Carolina War of 1812 Bicentennial

Ohio
Ohio War of 1812 Bicentennial Commission

Virginia
James Madison Center War of 1812 Bicentennial
Virginia Bicentennial of the War of 1812 Commission

Washington, D.C.
Washington DC War of 1812 Bicentennial Commission "Building Heritage Bridges"

References

External links
 Online PBS film and shorts on the War of 1812 from WNED

War of 1812
United States historical anniversaries
Bicentennial anniversaries
Canadian historical anniversaries
2010s in Canada
2010s in the United States